Johann Ernst of Hanau-Münzenberg-Schwarzenfels (13 June 1613 in Schwarzenfels – 12 January 1642 in Hanau), was the last Count of the Hanau-Münzenberg line. He succeeded his grand-nephew Philipp Ludwig III in 1641. When Johann Ernst died in 1642, Hanau-Münzenberg fell to the Hanau-Lichtenberg line.

Youth 
Johann Ernst was the son of Count  Albrecht of Hanau-Münzenberg-Schwarzenfels and his wife, Countess Ehrengard of Isenburg-Büdingen.

Johann Ernst was educated at the school of the former convent in Schlüchtern, which is now called the Ulrich-von-Hutten-Gymnasium, and the University of Basel. After completing his studies, he undertook a Grand Tour to France. He returned home in 1633. The Thirty Years' War forced him and his family to Worms and later to Strasbourg, where they faced great financial difficulties. After his father died there, he followed his mother to Frankfurt.

Unlike his father, he did not challenge his nephew's right to rule Hanau-Münzenberg alone and did not demand a role as co-regent. He got on well with the ruling count, his nephew Philipp Moritz and his wife Sibylle Christine of Anhalt-Dessau.

Reign 
Philipp Ludwig III died on 21 November 1641 at the age of 9. With his death, the main Hanau-Münzenberg line died out in the male line, and the county fell to Johann Ernst, as the only male representative of the collateral line Hanau-Münzenberg-Schwarzenfels.

Shortly after ascending the throne, he became engaged to Susanna Margarete of Anhalt-Dessau, a sister of Sibylle Christine. However, he died before they could marry. Susanna Margarethe later married Johann Philipp of Hanau-Lichtenberg. Her sister, Sibylla Christina, married Johann Philipp's elder brother, who was Johann Ernst's successor, Friedrich Casimir. Both marriages remained childless.

Death 
Johann Ernst died of smallpox on 12 January 1642, after reigning for only seven weeks. The attending physicians, including Peter de Spina III, had only recognized the disease very late and had treated him with laxatives and bloodletting when he was dying.

He was buried on 26 February 1642 in the family vault in the St. Mary's Church in Hanau, which had to be extended first, as it was full.  The metal coffin in which he was buried, was stolen in 1812, during the Napoleonic Wars. His body and corpses from other stolen coffins, were reburied in a common coffin.

Johann Ernst was succeeded by Friedrich Casimir, who was also Count of Hanau-Lichtenberg, thereby reuniting Hanau in a single hand, after a 184-year split. As Friedrich Casimir was still a minor, he stood under the regency of Baron Georg II of Fleckenstein-Dagstuhl.

Ancestors

References 
 Rudolf Bernges: Johann Ernst, der letzte Graf von Hanau-Münzenberg, in: Hanauer Anzeiger of 5 May 1928
 Fr. W. Cuno: Philipp Ludwig II., Graf zu Hanau und Rieneck, Herr zu Münzenberg. Ein Regentenbild nach archivalischen und anderen Quellen gezeichnet für unsere Zeit, Prague, 1896
 Reinhard Dietrich: Die Landesverfassung in dem Hanauischen = Hanauer Geschichtsblätter, vol. 34, Hanau, 1996, 
 Funeral sermon in Katalog der Leichenpredigten und sonstiger Trauerschriften im Hessischen Staatsarchiv Marburg = Marburger Personalschriften-Forschungen vol. 14, Sigmaringen, 1992
 Reinhard Suchier: Genealogie des Hanauer Grafenhauses, in: Festschrift des Hanauer Geschichtsvereins zu seiner fünfzigjährigen Jubelfeier am 27. August 1894, Hanau, 1894
 Ernst J. Zimmermann, Hanau Stadt und Land, 3rd ed., Hanau, 1919, reprinted: 1978

Counts of Hanau-Münzenberg
1613 births
1642 deaths
17th-century German people